The Old Oak and Park Royal Development Corporation (OPDC) is a mayoral development corporation established in April 2015 by the Mayor of London.

Organisation
The Old Oak and Park Royal Development Corporation was established by the Mayor of London. Approval was granted by the Secretary of State for Communities and Local Government, Eric Pickles in January 2015.

The corporation is responsible for regenerating 650 hectares including the common land area of Old Oak Common and the industrial Park Royal site in West London. Plans are in place for the construction of 24,000 homes in Old Oak, consisting of a mixture of house types and tenures, along with opportunities for a minimum of 1,500 new homes to be built in non-industrial areas in Park Royal. In addition to this, the creation of 65,000 new jobs will stem from the development of the Old Oak Common station and the attraction of new businesses to Park Royal, joined by those who relocate from Old Oak.  The aforementioned, along with the addition of a new HS2 and Elizabeth Line station makes Old Oak and Park Royal one of the largest regeneration projects in Europe.

Old Oak Common is a large area of common land situated in the London boroughs of Hammersmith and Fulham, Brent and Ealing. The corporation assumes various statutory powers related to planning, infrastructure, regeneration and land acquisitions.

Board members
Liz Peace  – Chairman 
William Hill – Property investment specialist 
Natalie Campbell – Director of Insight and Innovation at The Royal Foundation
Rahul Gokhale – Commercial Director at Allpex
William Mckee – CEO, Accessible Retail
Jules Pipe  – Deputy Mayor, Planning, Regeneration and Skills
Shevaughn Rieck – Partner at Farrells LLP
Michael Simms – Director of the Acton Community Forum
Helen Ward – Professor of Public Health at Imperial College London 
Victoria Quinlan – Managing Director, Investment Management at Lendlease
Rahul Gokhale – Commercial Director at Allpex
 Muhammed Butt – Leader of Brent Council
Julian Bell – Leader of Ealing Council
Stephen Cowan – Leader of Hammersmith & Fulham Council

References

External links 

 

2015 establishments in the United Kingdom
2015 in London
Greater London Authority functional bodies
Development Corporations of the United Kingdom
Government agencies established in 2015
Local government in London